Colavita–HelloFresh is a professional women's cycling team based in the United States that competes in elite road bicycle racing events.

Colavita started sponsoring the team in 2003; in August 2017 the company said that it intended to withdraw its sponsorship at the end of the year.

Team roster

Major wins

2009
Stage 3 Tour de Vineyards, Catherine Cheatley Sell
Stage 1 Sea Otter Classic, Kelly Fisher Goodwin
Stage 2 Sea Otter Classic, Tiffany Cromwell
Roswell Criterium, Tina Pic
Beaufort Criterium, Kelly Fisher Goodwin
Sandy Springs Criterium, Tina Pic
Tour of Somerville Criterium, Tina Pic
Arlington Criterium, Erica Allar
Stage 3 Nature Valley Grand Prix, Erica Allar
Stage 2 Fitchburg Longsjo Classic, Tina Pic
Stage 3 Fitchburg Longsjo Classic, Andrea Dvorak
Stage 4 Fitchburg Longsjo Classic, Tina Pic
Stage 2 Route de France Féminine, Tiffany Cromwell

2010
Overall Valley of the Sun Stage Race, Carmen Small
Stage 2 San Dimas Stage Race, Kelly Fisher Goodwin
Stage 2 Redlands Bicycle Classic, Theresa Cliff-Ryan
Stages 2 & 3 Joe Martin Stage Race, Modesta Vžesniauskaitė
Overall Fitchburg Longsjo Classic, Catherine Cheatley Sell
Stages 1 & 2, Catherine Cheatley Sell
Stage 1 Cascade Classic, Catherine Cheatley Sell
UCI Track – World Cup, Melbourne, Team Pursuit, Kate Bates
UCI Track – World Cup, Cali, Team Pursuit, Rushlee Buchanan

2013
UCI Track – World Cup, Guadalajara, Team Pursuit, Laura Brown
UCI Track – World Cup, Manchester, Points race, Laura Brown
UCI Track – World Cup, Los Angeles, Team Pursuit, Laura Brown

2014
Stage 5 Ras na mBan, Olivia Dillon

2016
Grand Prix Cycliste de Gatineau Road Race, Kimberley Wells
Stage 4 Tour Down Under, Kimberley Wells
Dottignies Road Race Elite/U23, Kimberley Wells
Giro di Burnaby Criterium, Kimberley Wells
Stage 4 Cascade Classic, Kimberley Wells

2017
Rochester Cyclo-cross, Ellen Noble
Gloucester Cyclo-cross, Ellen Noble
Cincinnati Cyclo-cross, Ellen Noble

Regional & national champions
2009
 USA Criterium, Tina Pic

2010
 New Zealand Road Race, Rushlee Buchanan
 New Zealand Track (Scratch race), Rushlee Buchanan
 New Zealand Track (Team pursuit), Rushlee Buchanan

2013
 Caribbean Time Trial, Kathryn Bertine

2017
 USA U23 Cyclo-cross, Ellen Noble

References

UCI Women's Teams
Cycling teams based in the United States
Women's sports teams in the United States
Cycling teams established in 2016
2016 establishments in the United States